David Johnson-Davies is a British computer scientist and journalist.

Early life and education
David Johnson-Davies was born in London and has three children.

He studied Experimental Psychology in Cambridge (where he currently resides), and became a researcher at the Medical Research Council Applied Psychology Unit (now the MRC Cognition and Brain Sciences Unit).

Career
In 1980, Johnson-Davies completed a PhD and then went on to join the computer company Acorn, developers of the BBC Microcomputer. Johnson-Davies was the founder and managing director of Acornsoft, publisher of video games such as Elite and the VIEW business software range by Mark Colton.

In 1982, Johnson-Davies wrote Practical Programs for the BBC Computer and Acorn Atom.

In 1986, he left Acornsoft and established Human Computer Interface shortly afterwards. The company developed Macintosh-based programs compatible with BBC BASIC and BBC Micro software, disks and networks, including for Hitachi and Royal Mail.

Johnson-Davies also contributed several articles to Acorn User. 
In May 1986, he discussed the infinite graphical potential of Benoit Mandelbrot’s mathematics in "Join the Mandelbrot Set". In July 1986, Johnson-Davies applied the Newton–Raphson method for finding the roots of an equation to create images that display fractal behaviour, featured in "Back to the Roots". In the October 1986 issue, he wrote "Spider Power" alongside quantum computing pioneer David Deutsch.

In 2000 he created Identifont, a website which identifies typefaces from provided samples.

David then went on to develop Fontscape (copyrighted in 2000) and Fontifier.

References

Living people
British computer scientists
Journalists from London
Scientists from London
Year of birth missing (living people)